Hell's Lovers Motorcycle Club (HLMC), is a multi-ethnic motorcycle club founded in Chicago in 1967. One of the first integrated biker clubs in Chicago, the club was founded by Frank "Claim-Jumper" Rios after he was denied membership in another motorcycle club. The club's motto is, "Death is my sidekick and the highway is my home." A  "0%"  diamond is worn in place of the traditional "1%" to signify being 0% nice. 
In June 2008, the Ironhorse Roundup Bike Show, a swap meet at the Lake County Fairgrounds, was canceled by Grayslake, Illinois mayor Timothy Perry after state and Federal law enforcement authorities had warned the Grayslake police chief of threats of violence between the Hell's Lovers and a rival outlaw gang, the Outlaws Motorcycle Club.

Notes

References
 

1967 establishments in Illinois

Motorcycle clubs
Motorcycle clubs in the United States